Belgravia is a historical drama, set in the 19th century, based on the 2016 novel of the same name by Julian Fellowes—both named after Belgravia, an affluent district of London. The limited series, a co-production between Carnival Films and American cable network Epix, is adapted by Fellowes from his novel, and reunites the production team behind Downton Abbey with Gareth Neame and Nigel Marchant executive producing alongside Liz Trubridge and Fellowes. Belgravia is directed by John Alexander, and produced by Colin Wratten.

The series premiered in the UK on ITV on 15 March 2020 and in the U.S. on 12 April 2020 on Epix. A follow-up series to be written and developed by Helen Edmundson was announced in September 2022.

Premise
Belgravia begins at the Duchess of Richmond's ball  (night of 15/16 June 1815), which was held in Brussels for the Duke of Wellington on the eve of the Battle of Quatre Bras, two days before the Battle of Waterloo.

Cast

The Trenchard family
Philip Glenister as James Trenchard
Tamsin Greig as Anne Trenchard
Richard Goulding as Oliver Trenchard, son of James and Anne
Emily Reid as Sophia Trenchard, daughter of James and Anne
Alice Eve as Susan Trenchard, wife of Oliver
The Trenchard servants
Paul Ritter as Turton, butler to the Trenchards
Saskia Reeves as Ellis, lady's maid to Anne Trenchard
Bronagh Gallagher as Speer, lady's maid to Susan Trenchard
The Bellasis family
Tom Wilkinson as Peregrine Bellasis, Earl of Brockenhurst
Harriet Walter as Caroline Bellasis, Countess of Brockenhurst
Jeremy Neumark Jones as Edmund, Viscount Bellasis, only son of the Earl and Countess of Brockenhurst and heir apparent to the title
James Fleet as Reverend Stephen Bellasis, younger brother of the Earl of Brockenhurst and heir presumptive to his elder brother
Diana Hardcastle as Grace Bellasis, wife of Stephen Bellasis
Adam James as John Bellasis, son of Stephen Bellasis and Grace Bellasis and heir to his father                                                                      
The Grey family
Tara Fitzgerald as Corinne Grey, Dowager Countess of Templemore
Ella Purnell as Lady Maria Grey, daughter of the Dowager Countess of Templemore
The Pope family
Serena Evans as Mrs Pope, foster mother to Charles Pope
Jack Bardoe as Charles Pope
Characters at the Duchess of Richmond's ball
Nicholas Rowe as Arthur Wellesley, Duke of Wellington
James Chalmers as Sir William Ponsonby
 Gunnar de Jong as the Prince of Orange
Diana Kent as the Duchess of Richmond
Robert Portal as the Duke of Richmond
Miscellaneous
Naomi Frederick as Duchess of Bedford
Penny Layden as Mrs Babbage
 Jack Shalloo as Morris
 Nigel Allen as Robert
 Stevee Davies as  Brodsworth

Episodes

Production
On 14 January 2019, it was announced that ITV had given a series order consisting of six episodes to a television adaptation of Julian Fellowes' 2016 novel Belgravia. The series was expected to be written by Fellowes and directed by John Alexander. Executive producers were set to include Gareth Neame, Nigel Marchant, and Liz Trubridge with Colin Wratten serving as a producer. Production companies involved with the series were slated to consist of Carnival Films. On 8 February 2019, it was reported that American premium cable network Epix had joined the production as a co-producer.

Principal photography took place in the summer of 2019. Many of the exteriors were shot in Edinburgh, with parts of the New Town standing in for Belgravia. Other locations included Edinburgh City Chambers and Hopetoun House.

The scenes that take place in Brussels were filmed at Hopetoun House in West Lothian, Wrest Park in Bedfordshire (chapel scenes) and the Bath Assembly Hall (ballroom scenes). The exterior of the Trenchard townhouse were filmed on Moray Place, in Edinburgh; most of the interiors were filmed at a mansion in Berwickshire, and also at a mansion in Basildon Park and Syon House in London. Some scenes take place at the Duchess of Bedford’s London townhouse; those were filmed in West Wycombe House in Buckinghamshire. Anne Trenchard's manor house is fictional, so filming was done at the manor house Loseley Park, in Guildford.

The production visited The Historic Chatham Dockyard and filmed on Anchor Wharf quayside, the Tarred Yarn Store as Pimm’s Chop House and the streets around the Ropery to stand in for both a London market and the streets around Girton’s Mill. Other shooting locations included the gardens at Hampton Court Palace, the Athenaeum Club in London, and Quarry Bank Mill in Cheshire.

References

External links

2020 American television series debuts
2020 American television series endings
2020s American drama television series
2020 British television series debuts
2020 British television series endings
2020s British drama television series
2020s American television miniseries
2020s British television miniseries
English-language television shows
ITV television dramas
MGM+ original programming
Television series created by Julian Fellowes
Television series set in the 1810s
Fiction set in 1815
Television shows based on British novels
Television series set in the 1840s
Fiction set in 1841